Simon Neale (born 20 January 1977 in Portsmouth, Hampshire, England), known by his stage names Shadow Child and Dave Spoon, is an English radio DJ and dance music producer. He's also part of the duo Avec alongside Doorly. He was part of the line-up on BBC Radio 1's "In New DJs We Trust" feature, which ran from Thursday night to Friday morning at 2 am to 4 am. The DJ has become notable for his hits, "Bad Girl (At Night)" with Lisa Maffia and "Baditude" with Sam Obernik. His first release as Shadow Child was on Dirtybird Records in March 2012, and he's since formed his own record label, Food Music, alongside Lewis of Kry Wolf. Simon has a show on Rinse FM from 9 am to 1 pm every Wednesday evening as Shadow Child.

Biography
Simon Neale grew up listening to a mixture of synth-pop and early '90s house and rave, and attended a secondary school that had an undiscovered TB-303 and Juno 60 in the music room cupboard.

Using his Dave Spoon alias, he's established himself on the UK dance scene. He signed "21st Century" to Toolroom Records in 2004. The piano-led "Sunrise EP" followed and was signed to Seamus Haji's Big Love imprint.

In 2006, Spoon released "At Night". With an added vocal in 2007 from Lisa Maffia, the track crossed over as "Bad Girl (At Night)" on Universal, earning Spoon his first top 40 hit, with the second coming in 2008 in the form of "Baditude" with collaborators Sam Obernik & Paul Harris from Dirty Vegas.

He followed this with DJ compilations for Ministry of Sound & Toolroom, remixes of songs by artists like Dizzee Rascal and The Pet Shop Boys, plus updates of classics such as Gat Décor's "Passion", having landed a residency on Radio 1's 'In New DJs We Trust' in 2008 and a residency for Cream in Ibiza.

His 2008 single "Baditude" entered the UK Singles Chart at No. 34 on downloads alone on 10 August. The following week, the song climbed to No. 29. He has launched his own label "Televizion", where he released the Pete Tong collaboration "Gas Face", which was used as title music for the Hammer Horror film Beyond the Rave.

"Friday" featuring Takura managed to enter the UK Singles Chart at number 193 after support from the likes of MistaJam on BBC Radio 1Xtra.

Discography

Compilation albums

Extended plays

Singles

As Dave Spoon
2005 "21st Century"
2005 "Front Lounge"
2005 "Who You Are"
2005 "Sunrise"
2005 "Corrupt"
2005 "Regeneration"
2006 "Afterhours" (featuring Mark Knight)
2006 "Outside"
2006 "Acid Box"
2006 "At Night"
2007 "Sylo" (featuring Mark Knight)
2007 "Background Noise"
2007 "Drum Box"
2007 "This Machine" (featuring Penny Foster)
2007 "Won't Do It Again (Sunrise)" (featuring Laura Vane)
2007 "Bad Girl (At Night)" (featuring Lisa Maffia)
2008 "88"
2008 "Liability"
2008 "Baditude" (featuring Paul Harris of Dirty Vegas & Sam Obernik)
2009 "Gas Face" (featuring PeteTong)
2009 "Ghost Train" (with DJ Zinc)
2009 "Lummox"
2009 "The Key"
2009 "The Secret"
2010 "Impure Imagination" (featuring Nick Corelli) Unreleased

As Shadow Child
2012 "String Thing" Shadow Child EP [Dirty Bird]
2012 "Rustic Chip" [Dirty Bird] (Shadow Child EP) 
2012 "The Verdict" [Free Giveaway]
2012 "So High" [Moda Black]
2012 "Bordertown" (with Horx featuring TK Wonder) [Apollo/R&S]
2012 "Comb Over" (with James Talk) [Dirty Bird]
2012 "Phil Collins" EP [Deleted]
2012 "23" EP [Food Music]
2012 "Sensible Haircut" [Food Music] (23 EP)
2012 "The Verdict Pt 2" [Food Music] (23 EP)
2013 "The Only One" [Dirty Bird]
2013 "Friday" (featuring Takura) [Food Music]
2014 "Steak Fingers" [Free Giveaway]
2014 "Climbin'" (with Doorly)

As Avec
2013 "Disappearer" (featuring Jake Shears)

Other appearances

Remixes

As Dave Spoon
2005 DJ Philippe B – "Step 2gether" (Dave Spoon remix) [Plasmapool]
2005 Southside Hustlers ft. Abigail Bailey – "Right Before My Eyes" [Toolroom]
2005 Sueno Soul – "A Better Love" (Dave Spoon remix) [Stealth]
2005 Juke Joint – "Melody of the Mouth" (Dave Spoon remix) [Big Love]
2005 Haji & Emmanuel – "Take Me Away" (Dave Spoon remix) [Big Love]
2006 Robbie Rivera – "Bizarre Love Triangle" (Dave Spoon remix) [Juicy Music]
2006 S & V – "King Coaster" (Dave Spoon remix) [Mono-Type]
2006 The Timewriter "Reachin' Out" (Dave Spoon remix) [Plastic City]
2006 Arno Cost – "Magenta" (Dave Spoon remix) [CR2]
2006 Beta Blokka – "Beta Blokka" (Dave Spoon remix) [Punchfunk]
2006 Dagaard & Morane – "Keep on Doing It" (Dave Spoon remix) [Born To Dance]
2006 Danny Freakaziod – "You Are The Leading Man" (Dave Spoon remix) [CR2]
2006 Antoine Clamaran – "Take Off" (Dave Spoon remix) [Plasmapool]
2006 Tyken ft. Awa – "Every Word" (Dave Spoon remix) [Hed Kandi]
2006 The Officials – "Music" (Dave Spoon remix) [Sequential]
2006 Golden Girls – "Kinetic" (Dave Spoon & TV Rock remix)
2007 Vorsprung – "Worth The Wait" (Dave Spoon remix) [Brickhouse]
2007 Paul van Dyk ft. Jessica Sutta – "White Lies" (Dave Spoon remix) [Positiva]
2007 Bump – "I'm Rushin" (Dave Spoon remix) [Art & Craft]
2007 Gat Decor – "Passion" (Dave Spoon remix) [Addictive]
2007 Gold, Diaz & Young Rebels – "Don't You Want Me" (Dave Spoon Remix) [Joia]
2007 Ethan – "In My Heart" (Dave Spoon remix) [Art & Craft]
2007 Robyn with Kleerup – "With Every Heartbeat" (Tong & Spoon Wonderland mix) [Konichiwa]
2007 D.O.N.S. – "Big Fun" (Dave Spoon remix) [Hed Kandi]
2007 Funkagenda – "San Francisco" (Dave Spoon remix) [Toolroom]
2007 Kharma 45 – "Political Soul" (Dave Spoon remix) [EMI]
2007 Liquid – "Sweet Harmony" (Dave Spoon remix) [GI]
2007 Richard Grey – "Warped Bass" (Dave Spoon remix) [Apollo]
2007 Andrea Doria & LXR – "Freak Me" (Dave Spoon remix) [Hed Kandi]
2007 Cedric Gervais – "Spirit in My Life" (Dave Spoon remix) [Data]
2007 Dave Lee – "Latronica" (Dave Spoon remix) [Z records]
2007 Dizzee Rascal – "Flex" (Dave Spoon Reflex) [XL Recordings]
2008 Pet Shop Boys – "Integral" (Dave Spoon Remix) [EMI]
2008 James Blunt – "1973" (Tong & Spoon Wonderland mix) [Warner]
2008 Kaz James – "All Fall Down" (Dave Spoon remix) [Sony]
2008 Alphabeat – "Boyfriend" (Dave Spoon remix) [Chrysalis]
2008 The Presets – "Talk Like That" (Dave Spoon Televised Remix) [Modular]
2008 Madonna – "Give It 2 Me" (Tong & Spoon Wonderland mix) [Warner. Bros]
2009 Cagedbaby – "Forced" (Dave Spoon remix) [Southern Fried]
2009 Sour Grapes – "Kharma" (Dave Spoon remix) [Television]
2009 Killa Kella – "Built Like An Amplifier" (Dave Spoon remix) [100%]
2009 Chase & Status feat. Kano – "Against All Odds" (Dave Spoon Remix) [RAM]
2009 The Ting Tings – "Fruit Machine" (Dave Spoon remix) [Columbia]
2009 Calvin Harris – "Ready for the Weekend" (Dave Spoon remix) [Sony]
2009 VV Brown – "Game Over" (Dave Spoon remix) [Island]
2009 Mr Hudson – "White Lies" (Dave Spoon remix) [Mercury]
2009 Beyoncé – "Sweet Dreams" (Dave Spoon remix) [Columbia]
2010 Labrinth – "Let the Sun Shine" (Dave Spoon remix) [Syco/Sony]

As Shadow Child
2012 Kid Kombat – "Chinga" [Television]
2012 Hardrive – "Deep Inside" [Strictly Rhythm]
2012 Hadouken! – "Parasite" [Ministry of Sound]
2012 Drumsound & Bassline Smith featuring Tom Cane – "Through the Night" [New State Music]
2012 S.K.A.M – "I Got What You Need" [ALiVE]
2012 Pedro Mercado & Kerada – "Behind the Sun" [Gold/Kling Klong]
2012 Zombie Disco Squad – "Ibiza Hooligan" [Made To Play]
2012 The House Crew – "Keep the Fire Burning"
2012 Miguel Campbell – "Rockin Beats" [Hot Creations]
2012 A-Trak & Zinc featuring Natalie Storm – "Like the Dancefloor" [Fool's Gold Records]
2012 The xx – "Angels" (bootleg)
2012 Sub Focus featuring Alpines – "Tidal Wave" [RAM Records]
2012 Zoe Xenia & Cari Lekebusch – "Good Love" [Kling Klong]
2012 The Other Tribe – "Sing with Your Feet"
2012 Justin Martin & Leroy Peppers – "Riding Spaceships" [Dirtybird]
2012 Hot Since 82 – "Knee Deep in Louise" [Moda Black]
2013 Delphic – "Baiya" [Polydor]
2013 Lianne La Havas – "Elusive" [Warner]
2013 Alix Perez featuring Sam Willis – "Annie's Song" [Shogun Audio]
2013 Hot Natured featuring Anabel Englund – "Reverse Skydiving" [FFRR/Warner]
2013 Movement – "Feel Real" [Club Mod]
2013 Yousef featuring Charli Taft – "I See" [Defected]
2013 London Grammar – "Strong" [Metal & Dust]
2013 Javeon – "Lovesong" [PMR Records]
2013 AlunaGeorge – "Best Be Believing" [Island]
2014 Marlon Hoffstadt & Dansson – "Shake That" [FFRR/Parlophone]
2014 Lena Cullen – "Timeless" [Food Music]
2014 Example – "One More Day (Stay with Me)" [Epic Records UK/Sony]
2014 Duke Dumont – "Won't Look Back" [Adam Dyment/Virgin EMI]
2016 Jaydee – "Plastic Dreams"

References

English radio personalities
English DJs
English record producers
English house musicians
Living people
Musicians from Portsmouth
Remixers
1978 births
Electronic dance music DJs